John Paton may refer to:
John Paton (Covenanter) (died 1684) Scottish soldier and Covenanter, executed at the Grassmarket on 9 May 1684
John Stafford Paton (1821–1889), English general in the British Indian Army
John Gibson Paton (1824–1907), Protestant missionary to the New Hebrides
John Brown Paton (1830–1911), Scottish Nonconformist theologian
John Paton (VC) (1833–1914), Scottish recipient of the Victoria Cross
John Paton (general) (1867–1943), Australian Major General
John Paton (British politician) (1886–1976), Labour Member of Parliament for Norwich 1945–1950, Norwich North 1950–1964
Johnny Paton (1923–2015), Scottish footballer

See also
John Patten (disambiguation)
John Patton (disambiguation)